José Olguín can refer to:

 José Olguín (footballer), Chilean Olympic footballer
 José Olguín (water polo) (born 1926), Mexican Olympic water polo player